Phoebe Dunn (1914–1990) was an American author of children's literature. Dunn wrote at least 45 books.

She was also a photographer for local newspapers and advertising agencies.

Dunn died in January 1990 at the age of 74. She and her daughter Susan Hanson were on their way to visit Costa Rica to photograph the rainforests when their plane crashed outside Costa Rica, killing Dunn, her daughter, and 19 others.

Partial Bibliography
The Little Pig
The Little Duck
The Little Puppy
The Little Rabbit
The Little Lamb
The Little Kitten
Baby's Animal Friends
Big Treasury of Little Animals
Farm Animals

References

External links
 Phoebe Dunn Collection

1990 deaths
20th-century American photographers
1914 births
American children's writers
American women children's writers
20th-century American women writers
20th-century American women photographers